Another Day on Earth  is the twenty-fourth solo studio album by Brian Eno, released on 13 June 2005 in the UK and Europe through Hannibal Records, and on 14 June 2005 in the US.

Overview
This is the first Eno album to chiefly contain vocals in more than two decades.  Speaking of the album, Eno said, "The first one I've done like that for a very long time...25 years or so". In addition, he explained his current thoughts on lyrics in music; "Song-writing is now actually the most difficult challenge in music," he confessed.

Music
Eno recorded and mixed most of the album on a Mac, using Logic, over a period of four years. He also engineered it himself, "because otherwise I would have had to spend six years in a commercial studio and pay staff, and that would have become too expensive".

"Bottomliners" and "Under" were first worked on about six years previously, on a DA88, the latter songs' drumming being supplied by Willie Green. On the former, and on the ballad "And Then So Clear" he pitch-shifted his voice up an octave, using the gender-changing function on a Digitech Pro Vocalist creating a vocoder-like effect. His studio features a selection of hardware including a Lexicon Jam Man loop sampler and an Eventide H3000 Harmonizer.

The album is actually built around the "And Then So Clear" song. He says "... In one day, actually, I pretty much finished it ... I liked it so much, and I thought, how I am going release this song, and I thought, I have to write some others."

On the title track he repeatedly cut up the main phrase, so that "the listener had little windows on it." Similar "cut-up" methodologies were used for the lyrics of "This," in that he used his computer to generate some of the words.

"Under" is a nearly-identical version of a song that was on the unreleased 1991 album My Squelchy Life, which was released in 2014 as a bonus disc with a reissue of Eno's 1992 Nerve Net. It was also included in the Cool World soundtrack album.

For the ambient-style "A Long Way Down" Eno manually synchronised his vocals with an out of time keyboard melody, and on "Going Unconscious" he went back to using Koan generative music software for the textural background.

The distinctions between songs and instrumentals which contain vocals are deliberately blurred, particularly on the track "How Many Worlds": "There's just enough voice in there to make you hear it as a song, making it a bluff, a deceit."

The final track on the album, "Bone Bomb", was inspired by a newspaper story about a Palestinian girl who becomes a suicide bomber. The title refers to a point made by an Israeli doctor that when a suicide bomber detonates, the bomber's bones become shrapnel, adding to the destruction.

Track listing
All songs written and composed by Brian Eno, except where noted.
"This" – 3:33
"And Then So Clear" – 5:49
"A Long Way Down" – 2:40
"Going Unconscious" – 4:22
"Caught Between" (co-lyrics by Danny Hillis and Eck Ogilvie-Grant) – 4:25
"Passing Over" – 4:25
"How Many Worlds" (co-lyrics by Michel Faber) – 4:47
"Bottomliners" – 3:59
"Just Another Day" (additional music composed by Peter Schwalm) – 4:21
"Under" – 5:19
"Bone Bomb" – 3:09
"The Demon of the Mines" (Japan only bonus track) – 4:40

Notes
track 7 published by Opal Music, London (PRS) [in N. America & Canada by Upala Music Inc (BMI)], 2005.
tracks 8 & 9 published by Opal Music, London (PRS) [in N. America & Canada by Upala Music Inc (BMI)] and Editions Outshine / BMG-UFA, 2005. 
Brian Eno appears courtesy of Opal Ltd.

Personnel
 Vocals, multiple instruments – Brian Eno
 Keyboards – Jon Hopkins
 Guitar – Leo Abrahams, Steve Jones
 Violin – Duchess Nell Catchpole
 Piano, Synthesizer – Peter Schwalm
 Drums – Willie Green, Peter Schwalm
 Loops – Brad Laner, Brian Eno, Peter Schwalm
 Effects [Occasional Signals] – Dino
 Effects [Splutters] – Barry Andrews
 Spoken vocals – Inge Zalaliene (track 4), Aylie Cooke (track 11)
 Mastering – Simon Heyworth
 Artwork by [Design & Layout] – Sarah Vermeersch
 Photography [Back] – Qin Siyuan
 Photography [Front], Artwork By [Cover Design] – Brian Eno

Charts

References

External links
 SoundOnSound article
 Mix article
 Album's Russian release

Brian Eno albums
2005 albums
Albums produced by Brian Eno
Hannibal Records albums